Hong Kong International School (HKIS) is an international private school with campuses in Tai Tam and Repulse Bay, Hong Kong. The school was founded in 1966. Today, HKIS spans from reception one to the twelfth grade. Its Lower and Upper Primary Divisions are located in Repulse Bay, and the Middle and High Schools are located in Tai Tam. Hong Kong International School is accredited by Western Association of Schools and Colleges.

History
In 1964, a Hong Kong-based committee of the Lutheran Church–Missouri Synod (LCMS) first submitted a proposal to have the school built.

Hong Kong International School was founded in September 1966, its first location consisting of makeshift premises including residential flats in Chung Hom Kok, housing 120 students. The school was brought to life by the actions of three groups, all working together to the same ends; the Hong Kong Government (which granted land and interest-free loans), a group of American businessmen and representatives of the educational arm of the LCMS. On 14 September 1967, HKIS opened a new camp in Repulse Bay and housed 630 multi-national students. The first permanent school building, with seven stories, 32 classrooms, and a capacity for 750 pupils, cost $5,350,000 Hong Kong dollars. The campus included a cafeteria, library, and gymnasium. It became the first school in Hong Kong with a U.S. education program.

HKIS continued to expand over time, which led to the creation of a second building in Repulse Bay, and finally an additional campus in Tai Tam. Its first primary school building in South Bay Close, Repulse Bay, was dedicated in 1975. In the 1970s the school had both American students and students of other nationalities.

Lower Primary and Upper Primary remain in Repulse Bay while Middle School and High School are in Tai Tam. In 2003, HKIS and BrainPop collaborated on an episode of the latter about SARS/MERS. The school has just finished undergoing its fourth major infrastructure development plan around mid-2010 in the Middle School Campus, called the Middle School Annex.

In 2001 the student count was 2,650. In 2001 Charles Dull announced that he would not stay on after the end of his period as the head of the school. William Wehrenberg was to take over. Wehrenberg left his position in 2004.

Heads of School
The following have served as Head of School:

Robert "Bob" E. Christian (1966–1977)
 David F. Rittmann (1977–1996)
 Earl J. Westrick (1996–1997)
 Charles "Chuck" W. Dull (1997–2001)
 William B. Wehrenberg (2001–2004)
 James "Jim" A. Handrich (2004–2005)
 Richard W. Mueller (2005–2010)
 David J. "DJ" Condon (2010–2011)
 Kevin M. Dunning (2011–2014)
 Linda A. Anderson (Interim, 2014)
 Alan P. Runge (2014–2017)
 Ronald "Ron" Roukema (Interim, 2017–present)

Institution

Organisation

The school is divided into four divisions, all co-educational: Lower Primary (Grades R1 and R2-Grades 1 and 2), Upper Primary (Grades 3–5), Middle School (Grades 6–8) and High School (Grades 9–12). Lower Primary (LP) and Upper Primary (UP) are housed in the original building in Repulse Bay, while the Middle School (MS) and High School (HS) are in the newer building in Tai Tam.

Each school division has its own administration and student government organization; the high school's is known as the Senate, the middle school's is called the Student Leadership Team, and the upper primaries are called the Student Consul. The entire school is overseen by the current Head of School, Ron Roukema.

For the 2011/17 academic year, over 2,640 students (from over 40 different nationalities) and 500 faculty and staff occupy the two separate campuses of HKIS. Four libraries house a total of 200,000 books, periodicals and technological resources.

In 2000, of all of the international schools in Hong Kong, HKIS had the benefits and pay scheme that was for the largest HKD amount.

In 1994 Lutheranism was the school's religion.

Academics
The school follows an American curriculum, offering various Advanced Placement courses and 3 foreign languages in Middle School and High School:  French, Spanish and Chinese.  Chinese language study is mandatory for R1-G5 students.

Students in the High School division are required to study interdisciplinary Humanities, American History, Biblical Studies, Life Sciences, Physical Sciences, Mathematics, and also meet various requirements in Fine Arts, Information Technology, Asian Studies, and Physical Education & Health. Religious education is a compulsory element of the curriculum.

Independent Study and Senior Option, where students design their own coursework and present their studies to faculty advisors.

Fine arts
HKIS' High School has an extensive fine arts program, offering numerous the Performing and Visual arts courses. At least one arts credit is required for graduation, with at least one half-credit course in performance/studio arts and, if only the minimum requirement is met, a one half-credit fine arts survey course.

HKIS is a member of the Association for Music in International Schools (AMIS), which hosts honor festivals for students of international schools.  Acceptance is highly competitive and HKIS' Middle School and High School bands, choirs, and strings programs have been well represented at AMIS festivals since 2009.  HKIS's high school has also hosted the annual Southeast Asia Honor Band Program, inviting several major schools from the region (i.e. Jakarta, Taipei) to participate. At these festivals, HKIS also provided three honor bands of its own: the Middle School band, the Junior Varsity band, and a Varsity honor band. In 2005, the High School Wind Ensemble earned first place at the Hong Kong Schools Music Festival. The High School band also travels to various countries for the APAC Festival, where students work with composers such as Robert W. Smith to put on a full-length concert in a few days. This festival has been held in places like Seoul and Shanghai. The Middle School band performs twice annually: once publicly, often in Stanley or City Hall, and once privately, usually in the Middle School Gymnasium. Other instrumental programs include the Strings program, which performs twice a year.

In Middle School, there are two performances per year, a musical and a play. Along with these, there are also Musical Theater classes, drama classes, and classes on theater craft.

Finally, HKIS has various choirs: 

The Upper Primary choir of 60 

Several Middle School Choirs totaling over 100 singers 

Three High School choirs with a total membership of 80.  

Every year, the Madrigal Singers perform at the American Club's tree-lighting ceremony, the Rugby Sevens, and the Middle School choir sends a contingent to AMIS festivals around the world every year, in locations such as Kuala Lumpur (2012), Jakarta (2010), Scotland (2009), and Paris (2010).

The High School, visual arts program, offers classes of various levels in 2D studio art, 3D studio art, photography, and more recently, graphic design. Classes at the introductory level are more structured, with students gaining more freedom in project direction as they progress in the curriculum. There is a strong emphasis on socially conscientious art; students from the High School art program were invited in 2005 to participate in The Art Miles Mural Project, and the 100 People World Portrait Project (100People.org). The film program has also expanded in the past several years, now boasting the Tai Tam Virtual Film Festival, judged by industry professionals as well as media instructors throughout Hong Kong and the Asia region.

Students in both High School and Middle School can also participate in school plays and musicals, both backstage and onstage.  In the past three years alone, HKIS' HS and MS have produced many shows, including Into the Woods Jr., The Apple Tree, Aida, The Crucible, Picasso at the Lapin Agile, Thoroughly Modern Millie Jr., and The Bald Soprano.

Technology
In 1991, the school began operating its own bulletin board system (BBS), called "Dragon BBS". Additional technological infrastructure was installed around 1994.

In 2010, HKIS became a 1:1 (one laptop, one student) school, offering education in traditional and technological forms. Every student from grade 5 upwards was equipped with an Apple MacBook Pro and, younger students learn using a wide range of software using MacBook Pros, iPods, and iPads that remain at school. In 2013 the school switched to MacBook Airs for students participating in the 1:1 program.

Campuses
In 1994 John Haibrook of South China Morning Post described the Tai Tam campus as "reminiscent of a classy, overgrown Italian villa", and that it had an "isolated location". At that time, its capacity was 2,200.

Demographics

In 1969 the school had 900 students from 26  nationalities, with 80% being U.S. citizens.

Summer school
By 2004 the school established an extracurricular summer school, which was one of the largest in Hong Kong.

Recent developments
The Middle School completed a new annex during the summers of 2009 overlooking Tai Tam Bay.  

The annex includes:

Administrative offices. 

A boardroom.

Several new Modern Languages classrooms.

A flexible seminar/meeting space.  

Some of these classrooms have been earmarked to house the R1 classes during the redevelopment of the Lower Primary building.

In June 2011, HKIS announced that it would be redeveloping the Lower Primary school building in Repulse Bay.  The project will require Lower Primary students to move to a new school building for a period of three years.  During the redevelopment, the old building will be leveled. After turning down temporary campuses in Chai Wan and Hung Hom, HKIS announced in the Spring of 2013 that the lower primary students would move to the Tai Tam campus starting in the 2014-'15 school year. Offices and support staff rooms at Tai Tam will be retrofitted into classrooms, along with some space in the Middle School being turned over to the Lower Primary.  Work will begin in 2014. When completed, the new campus will feature an indoor swimming pool, a large auditorium, gymnasium and indoor and outdoor learning spaces and housing facilities for some teachers.

During the 2016–2017 academic year, HKIS celebrated its 50th anniversary. One of the biggest events included the 50th Anniversary Ball, among a series of other celebrations held throughout May 2017.

The school completed a complete renovation of the Lower and Upper Primary Campus in Repulse Bay. in 2017 and 2018, respectively These renovations include a renovated Lower Primary school with 6 new playgrounds, swimming pool, 750 student auditorium, a cafeteria and a "Wonder Lab" (maker space).  The Upper Primary school also received major renovations with all classrooms increasing size, a new Art, Science, and Design Garage, a new Chinese Cultural Center, a new cafeteria, a multiple purpose sports room, and a two-story indoor place area.

Notable students and alumni

Arts and Literature 

 Charlotte Agell, author of several children books and young adult novels
 Keith Bradsher, Pulitzer-prize winning journalist
 Adi Shankar, filmmaker
 Cathy Yan, film director

Athletics 

 Joe Alexander, NBA player; drafted eighth overall in the 2008 NBA draft
 Sidney Chu, Olympic short track speed skater; competed at the 2022 Winter Olympics
 Jamie Yeung, Olympic swimmer; competed at the 2020 Summer Olympics

Business 

 Jess Lee, partner at Sequoia Capital and former Chief Executive Officer at Polyvore
 Kevin Poon, entrepreneur, owner of Elephant Grounds
David Yeung, founder of Green Monday and OmniFoods

Entertainment 

Edison Chen, actor and singer
Kevin Cheng, actor and singer 
 Taku Hirano, percussionist and recording artist
Gouw Ian Iskandar, actor 
Juno Mak, singer and record producer 
Sarah McLaughlin, a singer-songwriter performing under the stage name Bishop Briggs 
Eliza Orlins, contestant on Survivor: Vanuatu, Survivor: Micronesia, and The Amazing Race 31 
Nicholas Tse, singer-songwriter and actor 
Jason Wade, lead singer of Lifehouse
Maude Latour, singer-songwriter

Others 
Erik Weihenmayer, first blind person to summit Mt. Everest

See also
Americans in China

References

External links

American international schools in Hong Kong
Repulse Bay
Primary schools in Hong Kong
Secondary schools in Hong Kong
Educational institutions established in 1966
Tai Tam
Association of China and Mongolia International Schools
1966 establishments in Hong Kong
Secondary schools affiliated with the Lutheran Church–Missouri Synod